ZZX may refer to:

The IOC country code for mixed teams at the Olympics
The Spider-Man ZZX, a type of SYAC UAV (Chinese unmanned aerial vehicle)
 Zhuzhou West railway station, China Railway pinyin code ZZX